The Audi Type B was introduced in 1910 as a successor to the Audi Type A, there was an overall 360 of the Type B built. It used a four-cylinder, two-block inline engine with 2.6 Litres of displacement. It developed  through a four-speed countershaft gearbox and a propeller shaft, which drove the rear wheels. The car had a ladder frame and two leaf-sprung solid axles.

Specifications

Sources 
 Schrader, Halwart: Deutsche Autos 1885-1920, Motorbuch Verlag Stuttgart, 1. Auflage (2002), 
 Werner Oswald: Alle Audi Automobile 1910-1980, Motorbuch Verlag Stuttgart, 1. Auflage (1980), 

Type B
Cars introduced in 1910